Affif Ben Badra (sometimes credited as Afif Ben Badra or Ben Badra, born 1960) is an actor and stuntman currently living in France. In the United States, he appeared as a warlord in the Roland Emmerich film 10,000 BC and as Tamas Morato in Sherlock Holmes: A Game of Shadows. He also appeared in the suspense/thriller film Taken, written by Luc Besson, and in the Spanish public TV series Aguila Roja

Partial filmography 
Dobermann (1997) - Le mac
 “ El beso del dragón “ 2002 
San Antonio (2004) - Le Brésilien
Distrito B13 (2004) - chico K2
Unleashed (2005) - Tough Man
Il ne faut jurer... de rien! (2005) - Bulevar Homme 1
Paris Lockdown (2007) - Le Gitan 1
Jacquou le croquant (2007) - Le berger moustachu
Skate or Die (2008) - Le Marseillais
Mesrine Parte 1: Killer Instinct (2008) - Le client énervé
10,000 BC (2008) - Warlord
Balance final (2011) - Latif Gueroud
Colombiana (2011) - Genarro Rizzo
Sherlock Holmes: A Game of Shadows' (2011) - Tamas MoratoThe Lookout (2012) - KarimAl otro lado de las pistas (2012) - Tripot HommePraschan Requiem (2012) - MafiosoColisión (2013) - Ayub (2013) - GregHermandad de Lágrimas (2013) - Omar8 Assassins (2014) - SharkanPiste noire (2014) - Slimane, le directeur de la coloThe Brothers Grimsby (2016) - Terapeuta de SpaEl teniente otomano'' (2017) - Christapor

References

External links

1960 births
Living people
French male film actors
French male television actors
French people of Israeli descent